NGC 4309 is a lenticular galaxy located about 55 million light-years away in the constellation Virgo. The galaxy was discovered by astronomer Christian Peters in 1881 and is a member of the Virgo Cluster.

NGC 4309 is classified as an AGN and has undergone ram-pressure stripping.

Globular clusters

See also
 List of NGC objects (4001–5000)

References

External links

4309
40051
Virgo (constellation)
Astronomical objects discovered in 1881
Lenticular galaxies
7435
Virgo Cluster
Active galaxies